Jean-Pierre Delaunay (born 17 January 1966 in Sainte-Adresse) is a French former footballer who spent most of his career with Le Havre AC, making 315 appearances for Le HAC, a club record. Delaunay is currently a youth coach with the club.

In August 1999 Delaunay signed for Scottish Premier League club Dundee United on a three-month contract, but due to injury problems he played only one match for the club and subsequently retired.

References

See also
 Dundee United FC Season 1999-00

1966 births
Living people
French footballers
Association football defenders
Ligue 1 players
Scottish Premier League players
Expatriate footballers in Scotland
Le Havre AC players
Dundee United F.C. players
French expatriate footballers
People from Sainte-Adresse
Sportspeople from Seine-Maritime
Footballers from Normandy